Super Auto Pets is an auto battler video game created by Team Wood Games published on Steam in which the player chooses pets with special abilities to fight against other users. The game has rose in popularity ever since popular streamers such as Ludwig and Northernlion have played the game, displaying it to their audiences. In February 2022, the game was made available on iOS and Android.

Gameplay 
The game consists of multiple turns which have two phases, the preparation phase and the battle phase.

During the preparation phase, the player manages their team before going into the battle phase by buying new pets, making pets stronger by feeding them food and increasing their level, and switching the position of the pet in the team. 

The battle phase begins after the player has finished the preparation phase. In this phase, the pets battle each other automatically without player control, and the pet on the right-most slot on the player team fights with the pet on the left-most slot on the opponent team. When one of the pets faints, the pet on the next slot takes the spot of the previously fainted pet, until one (or both) of the team has no pets left, at which point the battle results in a win, loss, or draw. If the player wins, they receive a trophy. If they lose, they lose a life point (the number of trophies remains the same). If the result is a draw, their life points and trophies remain unchanged. The player wins the game when they collect all 10 trophies.

Every two turns, players advance a tier, giving them access to more pets and food, which are generally better than the previous. Players begin at tier 1 and advance until tier 6, where they will no longer advance in tiers.

Players can battle against either other players' pets or AI-generated teams. All battles are performed asynchronously.

Versus Mode 
In addition to the regular game mode above, there is also versus mode available. In this mode, players may create or join rooms and face each other exclusively. The creator of the room can set which pack the room will use and certain rules, such as how much time each player has to complete their preparation phase or what the punishment for losing is (how many life points are lost).

Packs 
Within the game there are various packs available to choose from, which act as a roster of available pets to choose from during gameplay. Players may choose to fight against players' exclusively using the same pack as them or against all other players. There are 5 packs available to play at any time.

 The original pack of the game is known as the Turtle Pack, which includes the original pets of the game. This pack includes 58 pets and 16 food.
 The second pack is the Puppy Pack, which adds a series of new pets available mixed in with the original pets of the Turtle Pack. This pack adds 22 new pets. 
 The third pack is the Star Pack, which adds an entirely new roster of pets and focuses on the strawberry fruit and the accompanying mechanics with it. This pack also introduces the push mechanic, which allows players to move the order of pets on their own team or the enemy team. This pack has 57 new pets and 15 new food available. 
 The fourth pack is the Golden Pack, which holds the biggest roster of pets and focuses on the new trumpet mechanic, where pets can add trumpets, use trumpets, or neither, allowing their team to summon a golden retriever. This pack adds 62 new pets and 13 new food.
 The final pack is the Weekly Pack, which changes every week to include a new mix of pets and food for players to play with. This pack mostly uses the contents of the other packs, however, there are a handful of new pets that are not part of the previous packs.

Additionally, players can create their own packs, known as Custom Packs. Custom Packs can include any combination of pets and food from packs the player has bought. Each Custom Pack must follow guidelines, such as the number of pets and food that can be added in each tier.

References 

Android (operating system) games
Auto battler video games
IOS games
Video games about animals
Virtual pet video games
Windows games
2021 video games